Larry Cummings Kiala, better known by his stage name Yxng Bane (pronounced "young bane"), is a British rapper, singer and songwriter from East London.

Early and personal life
Kiala grew up in Custom House, an industrial district of East London's Canning Town neighbourhood. His mother is Congolese  and his father is Angolan. He has five siblings and attended Eastlea Community School in Canning Town and later attended Palmers college in Grays, Essex. He is an avid supporter of Arsenal F.C.

Career
Yxng Bane started his musical career in 2016, by uploading songs onto his SoundCloud account. In January 2016, he released his debut EP, Full Moon. In January 2017, Bane was featured on a remix of Ed Sheeran's hit single "Shape of You". In June 2017, he was featured on the single "Bestie" by rapper Yungen, which peaked at number 10 on the UK Singles Chart.

Artistry
Bane has cited Michael Jackson, Drake, Future, PartyNextDoor, 50 Cent, Tinie Tempah and Wizkid as his influences. While talking about his musical style in an interview with Billboard, he said; "In terms of music and artistry, I'm an artist who doesn't belong to a genre. I express myself however I need to express myself. Whether I need to rap about it or sing about it, however, I need to deliver the message, it will be delivered. In terms of genre, I think – no, it's not "I think." I know I don't belong to any genre because, for example, I'll do the "Rihanna," which is a slow, afroswing vibe and then I go and do "Froze," which is more the trap sound – more U.K. drill sound. So it's more about however I need to express it rather than belonging to a genre. It's more – I'm diverse."

Discography

Collaborative albums

Mixtapes

Extended plays

Singles

As lead artist

As featured artist
{| class="wikitable plainrowheaders" style="text-align:center;"
|+ List of singles as featured artist, with selected chart positions, showing year released and album name
! scope="col" rowspan="2"| Title
! scope="col" rowspan="2"| Year
! scope="col" colspan="3"| Peak chart positions
! scope="col" rowspan="2" style="width:10em;"| Certifications
! scope="col" rowspan="2"| Album
|-
! scope="col" style="width:3em;font-size:85%;"| UK
! scope="col" style="width:3em;font-size:85%;"| UKR&B
! scope="col" style="width:3em;font-size:85%;"| IRE
|-
! scope="row"| "Balenciaga"
| 2015
| —
| —
| —
|
| rowspan="4" 
|-
! scope="row"| "Honest"
| rowspan="5"|2017
| —
| —
| —
|
|-
! scope="row"| "Bestie"
| 10
| 2
| 69
|
 BPI: Platinum
|-
! scope="row"| "No Way"
| —
| —
| —
|
|-
! scope="row"| "When Ur Sober"
| —
| —
| —
|
|Tayá
|-
! scope="row"| "Forever"
| —
| —
| —
|
| rowspan="3" 
|-
! scope="row"| "Answerphone"
| rowspan="7"| 2018
| 5
| —
| 10
|
 BPI: Platinum
|-
! scope="row"| "Passion 4 Fashion"
| —
| —
| —
|
|-
! scope="row"| "Magic"
| —
| —
| —
|
| The Time Is Now
|-
! scope="row"| "Your Lovin'"
| 47
| 28
| —
|
 BPI: Gold
| 
|-
! scope="row"| "Creepin Up (The Come Up)"
| — || — || —
|
| Golden Boy
|-
! scope="row"| "Flair"
| — || — || —
|
| rowspan="2" 
|-
! scope="row"| "More Muni"
| — || — || —
|
|-
! scope="row"| "Santo Domingo"
| 2019
| — || — || —
|
| Forever Lit
|-
! scope="row"| "Really Love"
| 2020
| — || — || —
|
| rowspan="3" 
|-
! scope="row"| "Nice to Meet Ya"
| rowspan="2"| 2021
| 33 || — || 63
|
|-
! scope="row"| "Winners"{{small|(Smoko Ono featuring Yxng Bane, Chance the Rapper & Joey Purp)}}
| — || — || —
|
|-
| colspan="12" style="font-size:90%"| "—" denotes a recording that did not chart or was not released in that territory.
|}

Other charted and certified songs

Guest appearances

Filmography
 The Intent 2: The Come Up (2018) - cameo role
 HBK: The Prequel'' (2018) - starring role

Awards and nominations

References

External links
 

1996 births
Living people
English male rappers
English male singers
English people of Angolan descent
English people of Democratic Republic of the Congo descent
Black British male rappers
People from Canning Town
Rappers from London